Michael Lee (born April 18, 1980 in North Vancouver, British Columbia) is a field hockey player from Canada.

Lee earned his first senior cap on July 10, 2001 against Belgium in Brussels (win 3-2). The defender is a resident of Tsawwassen, British Columbia, and plays for Victoria Selects.

International senior competitions
 2001 – World Cup Qualifier, Edinburgh (8th)
 2002 – Commonwealth Games, Manchester (6th)
 2003 – Pan American Games, Santo Domingo (2nd)
 2004 – Pan Am Cup, London (2nd)
 2006 – Commonwealth Games, Melbourne (9th)

References 

1980 births
Living people
Canadian male field hockey players
Canadian people of English descent
People from Delta, British Columbia
Sportspeople from North Vancouver
Field hockey people from British Columbia
Field hockey players at the 2002 Commonwealth Games
Field hockey players at the 2006 Commonwealth Games
Commonwealth Games competitors for Canada